Lunglei (Pron: /ˈlooŋgˌleɪ/) is a town, situated in the south-central part of Mizoram state, northeastern India. Lunglei, literally meaning 'bridge of rock' got its name from a bridge like rock found in the riverine area around Nghasih - a small tributary of Tlawng the longest river in Mizoram. It is the largest town after the capital, Aizawl, located 165 km (102 miles) south of Aizawl.

History
Lunglei was the Capital of South Lushai Hill Districts for 10 years from 1888, as was Aizawl for the North Hill Districts. The two were united in 1898. Lunglei is the second-largest town in Mizoram and was an important town until the partition of India as it had direct access to Chittagong, a big city in Bangladesh which made Lunglei the commercial and education centre. As of 1912, there were only 2 shops in Lunglei 1922 which increased to 4 shopes in 1922. The first Jeepable road to Lunglei was made only in the 1950s. on 1 March 1966, the MNF declared unilateral Mizo Independence and attacked Assam Rifles post at Lunglei, captured the SDO and seized Rs 18 Lakhs from the Govt Treasury.

Geography
It has an average elevation of 1222  metres (4009 feet).

Demographics 
Lunglei is one of the prominent districts of Mizoram. The district is bounded on the north by Mamit and Aizawl districts, on the west by Bangladesh, on the south by Lawngtlai district, on the southeast by Saiha district, on the east by Myanmar and on the northeast by Champhai district.

As of the 2011 Census of India, Lunglei had a population of 57,011. Males constitute 52% of the population and females 48%. Lunglei has an average literacy rate of 84%, higher than the national average of 59.5%: male literacy is 84%, and female literacy is 83%. In Lunglei, 14% of the population is under 6 years of age.

Administration
The district of Lunglei has been further divided into major sub divisions of Hnahthial SDO (S), Lunglei SDO (S) and Tlabung SDO (S) and 4 R.D. Blocks, Bunghmun, Hnahthial, Lunglei and Lungsen. The district has 7 assembly constituencies. These are South Tuipui, Lunglei North, Lunglei East, Lunglei West, Lunglei South, Thorang and West Tuipui for the administrative convenience of the district officials. Lunglei town is the administrative headquarters of the district.

Education

The Major Educational Institutions of Higher Learning in Lunglei are:
Lunglei Government College, Lunglei
J.Buana College, Lunglei
Kapthangi College Lunglei. Electric Veng
Higher and Technical Institute of Mizoram
 Mizoram Polytechnic offering Engineering diploma courses.
 Lunglei Nursing College 
 Christian Hospital Serkawn Nursing College
 Mizoram Engineering College
District Institute of Education and Training (DIET)

Tourism

Some of the notable tourist spots of the district of Lunglei are:
 Zobawk Sports Academy
 Kawmzawl Park
 Khawnglung Wildlife Sanctuary
 Saikuti Hall  where most of the concerts and celebrations are held. A unique museum has also been established in the hall where local painters demonstrate their skill and exhibit their works.
 Thuamluaia Mual - is the second football stadium with Artificial turf in Mizoram.
For those tourists who want to add a bit of adventure in their sojourn to Mizoram, Lunglei offers them with a plethora of picnic spots to explore their inherent sporting skills and sportsman spirit. Lunglei district offers the tourists to enjoy natural splendor coupled with the rich cultural traditions of the region.

Media

Newspapers

Hnamdamna
Zochhiar
Lunglei Times
Daifim
Ralvengtu
Vulmawi
Lunglei Tribune
MAKEDONIA (Sunday)
Daily Post
Zunzam

Cable Networks
LDF Cable Network
J.B. Cable Network

Transport

The closest route to Lunglei in the 1890s was through Tlabung, a town about 35 kilometers from Lunglei where Karnaphuli River connects to Chittagong, a distance of about 90 kilometers. In the 1940s, a trip from Lunglei to Shillong or Kolkata passed through Chittagong rather than Aizawl.

A Helicopter service by Pawan Hans has been started between Aizawl and Lunglei.

Neighbourhoods

 AOC
 Bazar Veng
 Chanmari-I
 Chanmari-II
 Chanmari-III
 College Veng
 Electric Veng
 Farm Veng
 Falkawn
 Hauruang
 Hrangchalkawn
 Kikawn
 Luangmual
 Lunglawn
 Lungpuizawl
 Melte 
 Pukpui
 Rahsiveng
 Ramthar Veng
 Ramzotlang
 Salem Veng
 Sazaikawn
 Serkawn
 Sethlun
 Theiriat
 Vanhne
 Venghlun
 Venglai
 Zobawk North
 Zobawk South
 Zohnuai
 Zotlang

Economy 
Lunglei has 9.97% of the forest land within its total area. Most of the indigenous local inhabitants of the district of Lunglei depend on agriculture and earn their livelihood from growing crops. The cash crops of coffee and rubber help the district to earn its revenue. The farmers of the district mostly practice the traditional method of shifting cultivation, which is popularly referred to as jhum.
Rice is the principal crop in the agricultural economy. Cottage industries produce handloomed cloth, furniture, agricultural equipment, woven textiles, and bamboo and cane work. Lunglei is also the Church Headquarters of Baptist Church of Mizoram.

References

External links

 
Cities and towns in Lunglei district